The so-called Bull Site at Dhahrat et-Tawileh, also spelled Daharat et-Tawileh, in the West Bank is an open air ancient cult installation from 12th-century BCE Canaan, where the bronze statuette of a bull was found. There is agreement that the statuette represents a sacred bull, but which god was represented by it is unclear. The statuette has been variously associated with the gods El, Baal, and Yahweh.

Location

The site is located on the Dhahrat et-Tawileh ridge in the hills of the northern West Bank in Jenin Governorate, 75 meters above the ancient road through the Zababdeh valley between Dothan and Tirzah. It lies approximately 6 km south of Jenin, and 4 km east of Qabatiya. The site provides commanding views of other high points in northern Canaan including Mount Carmel to the west, Mount Tabor and Mount Meron to the north, Mount Gilboa to the northeast, and to the south Jebel Tamun (also spelled Jabal Tammun, 'Mount Tammun', some 2 km SSE of the town of Tammun, altitude 588 m, prominence 291 m).

Discovery
The site was discovered in 1977 by Ofer Broshi, a member of Kibbutz Shamir and soldier in the Israeli army, where he unearthed an ancient bull statuette. He brought the figurine back to his kibbutz where it was put on display with other antiquities owned by the kibbutz. While on display it was spotted by archaeologist Amihai Mazar who arranged its transfer to the Israel Museum where it is now part of the permanent collection. Based on Broshi's description Mazar was able to locate the discovery site at Dhahrat et-Tawileh and begin excavations.

Excavation history
Two short excavations were conducted by Mazar in April 1978 and September 1981 on behalf of the Institute of Archaeology at the Hebrew University of Jerusalem. Results of the excavation show that the site was single-phase (Iron IA) and was abandoned after only a short period of use. The archaeological evidence indicates the site's use as a cultic installation though the flint and pottery assemblage discovered potentially indicates domestic use. Israel Finkelstein's dating of the site to the Middle Bronze Age is, according to Mazar, based on a misreading of the pottery evidence and as such an early 12th-century dating should be retained.

Cult installation

Though there are a number of Iron Age I settlements in the area, the Bull Site lacks any evidence of settlement. Instead it sits on the summit of Dhahrat et-Tawileh and is thought to have served as a cult site for the surrounding settlements due to its hilltop location.

Built on bedrock in the 12th century, the site comprises a perimeter wall made from large boulders brought in from elsewhere, and what is thought to be a standing stone or altar with a paved area in front of it next to the enclosure's eastern entrance. Mazar, the excavation director, speculates that a sacred tree likely grew within the site's walls.

There is no agreement on the ethnicity of the local settlers who used the site, with suggestions ranging from the Israelites due to the site's location in Mannaseh's tribal allotment, the Canaanites, or migrants from north of Canaan.

Alternative views are that the site could have been a home for a family and their animals, or an enclosure for livestock.

Bull statuette

The statuette, found close to the western wall of the site, is of a Zebu bull measuring 17.5 cm long by 12.4 cm high and is made of bronze. It is notable not only for its naturalistic ears and eyes, but for being the largest such bull statuette found in Palestine. Though Mazar suggests it may be the product of a local Israelite craftsman, other scholars such as Ahlström believe it came either from Galilee, or further north again above the land of Canaan.

There is no consensus about which deity the statuette represents; it could be an image of El, Baal, or Yahweh.

See also
 Ancient Canaanite religion
 Sacred bull
 Origins of Judaism
 History of ancient Israel and Judah

References

Bibliography

12th-century BC establishments
1977 archaeological discoveries
Archaeological sites in the West Bank
Collections of the Israel Museum
Sculptures of bovines
Sacred bulls
El (deity)
Baal
Yahweh